Sir Leslie Bertram Gibson QC (14 May 189621 September 1952) was a British lawyer and judge.  He was Chief Justice of Hong Kong in the late 1940s.

Early life

Gibson was the son of George F Gibson of Coventry. He was educated at King Henry VIII School, Coventry.  He obtained an LLB from the University of London.

Service in Malaya

Gibson joined the Malayan Civil Service in 1920 and served in Malaya until 1937.  He was at one time official assignee at Penang. He also served as Crown Counsel and Assistant Legal Adviser, Malaya. While working in Malaya, he studied for the bar and was called to the Bar of Gray's Inn in 1930.

Legal career

In 1937, Gibson joined the Colonial Legal Service and in 1940 was appointed Attorney General of Trinidad. He was made a King's Counsel in Trinidad in 1942.

He served in that position until 1944 when he was appointed Attorney General of Palestine.

In 1948, he was appointed Chief Justice of Hong Kong upon the transfer of Henry Blackall to Africa. Gibson was knighted in the same year.

In 1950, he returned to England, where he was appointed legal adviser to the Foreign Office Administration of African Territories.  In 1951, he was appointed assistant legal adviser, Colonial Office and Commonwealth Relations Office.

Death

Gibson died on 21 September 1952 in Godalming, Surrey.

References

1896 births
1952 deaths
Alumni of the University of London
British Hong Kong judges
Chief Justices of the Supreme Court of Hong Kong
Knights Bachelor
People educated at King Henry VIII School, Coventry
20th-century King's Counsel
Attorneys-General of Mandatory Palestine
People from British Malaya
Attorneys General of British Trinidad and Tobago
Colonial Legal Service officers